Golden Buddha is a thriller novel written by Clive Cussler and co-authored with Craig Dirgo. It is the first in The Oregon Files series.

Plot summary
In Golden Buddha, Juan Cabrillo embarks on his first mission in The Oregon Files (although it is made clear that this is not the first mission for the team through references to other missions and its part in the book Flood Tide). The team is hired to find and recover a stolen statue, the Golden Buddha, stolen in 1959 from the Dalai Lama. The success of the team will determine the future of Tibet. Whilst playing the Russians off against the Chinese, the team must put their lives at risk in order to complete the mission. In their state-of-the-art vessel, disguised as a rusting heap of junk, they sail from Cuba to Macau, and there the team use their cunning and wit to outsmart a billionaire—Stanley Ho—and the Macau police. They also swindle one hundred million dollars' worth of bonds from billionaire Marcus Friday and convince the UN to ratify the military coup in Tibet.

Major characters
Protagonists

Although all the Corporation are involved in the Buddha heist and freeing of Tibet, they are assisted by the Dalai Lama and the Tibetan group "Dungkar". They are also helped by a flight attendant Rhonda Rosselli. Judy Michaels and Tracy Pilston made significant sacrifices in the Friday ripoff. Michael Halpert also sacrificed his reputation with the crew in the fake Buddha heist.

Antagonists

The major villain in Golden Buddha are the Chinese as the Corporation is fighting to free Tibet. They steal the (fake) Buddha from Macau billionaire Stanley Ho while avoiding Ling Po, a detective with the Macau police. The Corporation also tangle with software Billionaire Marcus Friday, who they swindle of a hundred million dollars' worth of bonds and art-dealer Winston Spencer, from whom they steal the real Buddha.

References

External links
 

The Oregon Files
2003 American novels
American thriller novels

Novels set in China
Collaborative novels